is a Japanese manga series by Maya Miyazaki. An anime television series by LMD aired in Japan between January and March, 2012.

Plot
The series follows the exploits of Aya Akabane, a busty and arrogant high school girl who is constantly trying to outdo her classmates in everything (especially anything topic related to sex), only to make a fool of herself in the process. The show is set at Gokuraku High School, an all-girls boarding school.

Characters

The main protagonist, a loud mouthed girl with an eye for looking sexy and a short fuse.

Aya's friend, who is often used as an outlet for Aya's rage, most often being grabbed by her ponytail.

Konatsu's best friend who is pretty normal compared to everyone else.

A mysterious girl who often talks about spiritual phenomenon. She appears to be romantically interested in Aya.

A wildly perverted girl who has various fantasies and constant nosebleeds.

A teacher at Aya's school and the head of a bosozuko biker gang.

Aya's older sister who is a gang member alongside Kaname and is greatly feared by Aya, despite her sweet and gentle personality and always having a smile on her face.

A wealthy transfer student who looks down on others, often calling them 'potato girls'; she prefers being called by her nickname "Minamin". She used to live in France and later Los Angeles until her father got a job transfer back in Japan. Upon her recent transfer, she's been assigned as the school's health officer and refers to Aya as "Aya-cchi"-(much to the latter dismay). She has an electric toothbrush that she calls "Francois".

Media

Manga
Gokujyo is written and illustrated by Maya Miyazaki. It started in Shueisha's Super Jump in 2009. After Super Jump ceased its publication in 2011, the manga was transferred to Grand Jump, It was also published in Grand Jump  website, where its most recent chapter was published in November 2015.

Anime
The manga has been adapted into an anime series by LMD. The series began airing on Chukyo TV from January 23, 2012. Certain episodes containing explicit content were not broadcast and were instead streamed on DMM's website from January 30, 2012. An additional original video animation episode was released on BD/DVD on June 26, 2013.

Episode list

References

External links
 Official manga site 
 Official anime site 
 

2009 manga
2012 anime television series debuts
Comedy anime and manga
Japanese LGBT-related animated television series
Seinen manga
Shueisha manga
Japanese webcomics
Yuri (genre) anime and manga